Bebearia cocalioides, the large palm forester, is a butterfly in the family Nymphalidae. It is found in Nigeria, Cameroon, the Republic of the Congo, the Central African Republic and the Democratic Republic of the Congo. The habitat consists of forests.

Subspecies
Bebearia cocalioides cocalioides (Congo, Central African Republic, western Democratic Republic of the Congo)
Bebearia cocalioides hecqi Holmes, 2001 (Nigeria: Cross River loop, Cameroon)

References

Butterflies described in 1988
cocalioides